The following comparison of accounting software documents the various features and differences between different professional accounting software, personal and small enterprise software, medium-sized and large-sized enterprise software, and other accounting packages. The comparison only focus considering financial and external accounting functions. No comparison is made for internal/management accounting, cost accounting, budgeting, or integrated MAS accounting.

Free and open source software

Proprietary software 

Systems listed on a light purple background are no longer in active development.

Further details

See also
 List of personal finance software
 List of ERP software packages
 Point of sale
 Comparison of development estimation software
 List of project management software

References 

Accounting software
Lists of software
Accounting Software